Boris Kabi is an Ivorian footballer who last played for Al-Shaab.

Club career statistics

Notes

References

External links
 Player profile -- Goalzz
 

1984 births
Living people
Footballers from Abidjan
Ivorian footballers
Association football forwards
Expatriate footballers in Morocco
Kuwait SC players
Al-Shaab CSC players
Expatriate footballers in Kuwait
Ivorian expatriate sportspeople in Kuwait
Al-Raed FC players
Expatriate footballers in Saudi Arabia
Ivorian expatriates in Saudi Arabia
Al Dhafra FC players
Ajman Club players
Dibba FC players
Expatriate footballers in the United Arab Emirates
Ivorian expatriate sportspeople in the United Arab Emirates
Saudi Professional League players
UAE First Division League players
UAE Pro League players
Kuwait Premier League players
Ivorian expatriate sportspeople in Morocco
Ivorian expatriate sportspeople in Saudi Arabia
Olympic Club de Safi players